Calvi is a comune (municipality) in the Province of Benevento in the southern Italian region Campania, located about 60 km northeast of Naples and about 10 km southeast of Benevento. It also belongs to the Samnium historical region. Its territory has an altitude of between 169m and 388m above sea level.

Up until 1958, San Nazzaro formed a single commune with present-day Calvi, named San Nazzaro Calvi.

Calvi borders the following municipalities: Apice, Mirabella Eclano, Pietradefusi, San Giorgio del Sannio, San Nazzaro, Venticano.

References

Cities and towns in Campania